This article lists the squads for the 2018 AFC Women's Asian Cup, the 19th edition of the AFC Women's Asian Cup. The tournament is a quadrennial women's international football tournament for national teams in Asia organised by the Asian Football Confederation (AFC), and was held in Jordan from 6 to 20 April 2018. In the tournament there were involved eight national teams. Each national team registered a final squad of 23 players, with the option of submitting a preliminary squad of 18–50 players. On 29 March 2018, the AFC announced the squads for teams of both the groups.

The age listed for each player is on 6 April 2018, the first day of the tournament. The numbers of caps and goals listed for each player do not include any matches played after the start of tournament. The club listed is the club for which the player last played a competitive match prior to the tournament. The nationality for each club reflects the national association (not the league) to which the club is affiliated. A flag is included for coaches that are of a different nationality than their own national team.

Group A

China
Head coach:  Sigurður Ragnar Eyjólfsson

Jordan
Head coach:  Michael Dickey

Philippines
Head coach:  Rabah Benlarbi

Thailand
The squad was announced on 18 March.

Head coach: Nuengrutai Srathongvian

Group B

Australia
The squad was announced on 19 March.

Head coach: Alen Stajcic

Japan
The squad was announced on 19 March. On 2 April, Yu Nakasato withdrew due to injury and was replaced by Moeno Sakaguchi.

Head coach: Asako Takakura

South Korea
The squad was announced on 9 March.

Head coach: Yoon Deok-yeo

Vietnam
The squad was announced on 22 March.

Head coach: Mai Đức Chung

Player representation
Statistics are per the beginning of the competition.

By club
Clubs with 4 or more players represented are listed.

By club nationality

By club federation

By representatives of domestic league

References

squads
2018